Sabina Mazo Isaza (born March 25, 1997) is a Colombian mixed martial artist who competed in the Flyweight division in the Ultimate Fighting Championship (UFC). She is the  former flyweight Legacy Fighting Alliance (LFA) champion.

Background
Mazo was born in Medellín, Colombia, but moved with her family to Florida, United States, as a baby. After three years in United States, the family returned to Medellín where she eventually grew up. Without any preceding interest in martial arts, Mazo begun training Brazilian jiu-jitsu in Gracie Colombia at the age of fifteen. Soon after she picked up boxing and continued towards mixed martial arts.

Mixed martial arts career

Early career 
Sabina Mazo was the two times Legacy Fighting Alliance flyweight champion and amassed a record of 6–0 prior signed by UFC.

Ultimate Fighting Championship 
Sabina Mazo made her promotional debut against Maryna Moroz on March 30, 2019 at UFC on ESPN 2. She lost the fight via unanimous decision.

Mazo faced Shana Dobson on August 17, 2019 at UFC 241. She won the fight via unanimous decision.

Mazo next faced JJ Aldrich on January 18, 2020 at UFC 246. She won the fight by split decision.

Mazo faced Justine Kish on September 12, 2020 at UFC Fight Night 177. She won the fight via a rear-naked choke submission in round three.

Mazo faced Alexis Davis in a bantamweight bout on February 27, 2021 at UFC Fight Night 186. She lost the fight via unanimous decision.

Mazo faced Mariya Agapova  on October 9, 2021 at UFC Fight Night 194. She lost the fight via rear-naked choke in round three.

Mazo was scheduled to face Mandy Böhm on March 12, 2022 at UFC Fight Night 203. However, Böhm withdrew from the bout and was replaced by Miranda Maverick. Mazo lost the fight via rear-naked choke in round two.

After completing her contract with her last bout, she was not offered a new contract.

Championships and accomplishments

Mixed martial arts
 Legacy Fighting Alliance (LFA)
LFA Flyweight Champion (one time) 
One successful title defense

Mixed martial arts record

|-
|Loss
|align=center|9–4
|Miranda Maverick
|Submission (rear-naked choke)
|UFC Fight Night: Santos vs. Ankalaev
|
|align=center|2
|align=center|2:15
|Las Vegas, Nevada, United States
|
|-
|Loss
|align=center|9–3
|Mariya Agapova
|Submission (rear-naked choke)
|UFC Fight Night: Dern vs. Rodriguez
|
|align=center|3
|align=center|0:53
|Las Vegas, Nevada, United States
|
|-
|Loss
|align=center|9–2
|Alexis Davis
|Decision (unanimous)
|UFC Fight Night: Rozenstruik vs. Gane
|
|align=center|3
|align=center|5:00
|Las Vegas, Nevada, United States
|
|-
|Win
|align=center|9–1
|Justine Kish
|Submission (rear-naked choke)
|UFC Fight Night: Waterson vs. Hill
|
|align=center|3
|align=center|3:57
|Las Vegas, Nevada, United States
|
|-
|Win
|align=center|8–1
|JJ Aldrich
|Decision (split)
|UFC 246
|
|align=center|3
|align=center|5:00
|Las Vegas, Nevada, United States
|
|-
|Win
|align=center|7–1
|Shana Dobson
|Decision (unanimous)
|UFC 241
|
|align=center|3
|align=center|5:00
|Anaheim, California, United States
|
|-
|Loss
|align=center|6–1
|Maryna Moroz
|Decision (unanimous)
|UFC on ESPN: Barboza vs. Gaethje
|
|align=center|3
|align=center|5:00
|Philadelphia, Pennsylvania, United States
| 
|-
|Win
|align=center|6–0
|Caroline Yariwake
|Decision (unanimous)
|LFA 54
|
|align=center|5
|align=center|5:00
|Costa Mesa, California, United States
|
|-
|Win
|align=center|5–0
|Shannon Sinn
|Decision (unanimous)
|LFA 37
|
|align=center|5
|align=center|5:00
|Sioux Falls, South Dakota, United States
|
|-
|Win
|align=center|4–0
|Linsey Williams
|KO (head kick)
|LFA 23
|
|align=center|1
|align=center|4:26
|Bossier City, Louisiana, United States
| 
|-
|Win
|align=center|3–0
|Jamie Thorton
|KO (head kick)
|LFA 9
|
|align=center|1
|align=center|4:50
|Shawnee, Oklahoma, United States
| 
|-
|Win
|align=center|2–0
|Reina Cordoba
|Decision (unanimous)
|Center Real Fights 19
|
|align=center|3
|align=center|5:00
|San José, Costa Rica
| 
|-
|Win
|align=center|1–0
|Alejandra Lara
|Decision (unanimous)
|Striker FC 18
|
|align=center|3
|align=center|5:00
|Barranquilla, Colombia
|
|-

See also
 List of female mixed martial artists

References

External links
 
 

Flyweight mixed martial artists
Colombian female taekwondo practitioners
1997 births
Living people
Colombian female mixed martial artists
Mixed martial artists utilizing taekwondo
Mixed martial artists utilizing Brazilian jiu-jitsu
Colombian practitioners of Brazilian jiu-jitsu
Female Brazilian jiu-jitsu practitioners
Sportspeople from Medellín
Ultimate Fighting Championship female fighters
21st-century Colombian women